Peter Riley (born 1940) is a contemporary English poet, essayist, and editor. Riley is known as a Cambridge poet, part of the group loosely associated with J. H. Prynne which today is acknowledged as an important center of innovative poetry in the United Kingdom. Riley was an editor and major contributor to The English Intelligencer. He is the author of ten books of poetry, and many small-press booklets. He is also the current poetry editor of the Fortnightly Review and a recipient of the Cholmondeley Award in 2012 for "achievement and distinction in poetry".

Early life
He was born in Stockport, near Manchester, and raised in an environment of working people, Riley "entered higher education through Britain's post-war socialistic educational policies". He read English at Pembroke College, Cambridge, and has since lived and worked in the UK and abroad in teaching at several levels and other occupations. A Cambridge resident since 1985, he ran a mail-order poetry book business for almost twenty years.

Career

He has written studies of Jack Spicer, T. F. Powys, improvised music, poetry, lead mines, burial mounds, village carols and Transylvanian string bands, and has published two books of translations from the French poet Lorand Gaspar. He has been an advocate for neglected British poets from the 1930s and 1940s, in particular Nicholas Moore (1918–1986), and he has edited several posthumous books of Moore's.

Riley was the co-editor (with Andrew Crozier and others) of the important poetry/poetics journal The English Intelligencer (1965–1968), and editor of the later Collection (1968–1970). From the 1980s to the 2000s he ran the imprint Poetical Histories, which focussed on brief (4-12pp) pamphlets published on fine paper. Notable publications included J.H. Prynne's Marzipan and his sole poem in Chinese, Jie ban mi Shi Hu; R. F. Langley's Man Jack; and late work by the older poets Seán Rafferty and Dorian Cooke.

In the 1970s Riley was an important early promoter of and advocate for British free improvisation, and the noted guitarist Derek Bailey was a lifelong friend; two of Bailey's late solo albums, Takes Fakes & Dead She Dances and Poetry and Playing, contain tracks of Bailey playing guitar while reading aloud from Riley's poetry. Several books of Riley's from this period are responses to free jazz and free improvisation: The Musicians The Instruments (poetry, The Many Press, 1978) and Company Week (prose, Compatible Recording and Publishing, 1994) in response to Bailey's 1977 Company Week event, and The Whole Band (Sesheta, 1972), in response to performances by John Tchicai's Cadentia Nova Danica. This habit of responding to music in his poetry has continued in more recent work, such as the Reader/Author/Lecture series (with poems for or after Syd Barrett, Arnold Schoenberg, John Sheppard and others) and his more recent books concerning music encountered on his travels in Eastern Europe.

Riley was the subject of an essay collection, The Poetry of Peter Riley (The Gig, 1999/2000) and a poetry festschrift, April Eye (Infernal Methods, 2000).

Excavations & Riley's poetics
Distant Points is a series of prose poems arising from the author's meditations on 19th century excavation reports of prehistoric burial mounds in the north of England. As Riley himself explains, this particular work is: 

Commenting on this work, American poet and Zukofsky scholar Mark Scroggins offers this insight:

Selected publications
Love-Strife Machine (Ferry Press, 1969)
The Linear Journal (Grosseteste Press, 1973)
Strange Family: 12 Songs (Burning Deck, Providence, 1973)
Preparations: 26 Commentaries (Curiously Strong, 1979)
Lines on the Liver (Ferry Press, 1981)
Tracks and Mineshafts (Grosseteste Press, 1983)
Noon Province (Poetical Histories, Cambridge, 1989)
Distant Points: Excavations Part One, Books One and Two (Reality Street Editions, 1995)
Snow has Settled ... Bury Me Here (Shearsman Books, 1997)
Passing Measures, Selected poems 1966–1996 (Carcanet, 2000)
Messenger Street (Poetical Histories, 2001) note: this is a pamphlet containing four elegies for the poet Douglas Oliver
The Dance at Mociu (Shearsman, 2003)
Alstonefield: a poem (Carcanet, 2003)
The Day's Final Balance: uncollected writings 1965–2006 (Shearsman, 2007)
The Llyn Writings (Shearsman, 2007)
Greek Passages (Shearsman, 2009)
The Derbyshire Poems (Shearsman, 2010) note: this is a one-volume reissue of Tracks and Mineshafts and Lines on the Liver with additional material
The Glacial Stairway (Carcanet, 2011)
XIV PIECES (Longbarrow Press, 2012)
The Ascent of Kinder Scout (Longbarrow Press, 2014)
Due North (Shearsman, 2015)
The Fortnightly Reviews: Poetry Notes 2012-2014 (Odd Volumes, 2015)
Collected Poems, Vols I & II (Shearsman, 2018)
Truth, Justice, and the Companionship of Owls (Longbarrow Press, 2019)

References

Further reading
Riley, Peter. "The Creative Moment of the Poem."  In Poets on Writing: Britain, 1970–1991, ed. Denise Riley, 92-113. Houndmills: Macmillan, 1992.
The Poetry of Peter Riley (The Gig: issue 4/5, Toronto: November 1999/March 2000) — devoted to studies of Riley's poetry, plus an interview and bibliography. 
Keith Tuma, Fishing by Obstinate Isles: Modern and Postmodern British Poetry and American Readers. Evanston, Ill.: Northwestern UP, 1998. (Contains an essay on Excavations.)

External links
April Eye - Peter Riley's website
Archive of 'Poetry Notes' columns in The Fortnightly Review
Author Page at the British Electronic Poetry Centre
Peter Riley in Conversation with Keith Tuma interview at Jacket Magazine website
Mark Scroggins review of Distant Points
Peter Riley's 'Excavations' reviewed at "Intercapillary Space"
Peter Riley Feature at Poetica.net A search on the Homepage will link to poems, biography, and a dialogue between Peter Riley and Spilios Argyropoulos, The origins and trajectories of English avant garde poetry in the last 40 years 

1940 births
Living people
People from Stockport
Alumni of Pembroke College, Cambridge
English male poets